Boreel is a surname. Notable people with the surname include:

Adam Boreel (1603–1667), Dutch theologian
Jacob Boreel (1630–1697), Dutch burgomaster
Wendela Boreel (1895–1985), British artist

See also
Boreel baronets, an English baronetcy
Borel (surname)

Dutch-language surnames